The 1987 Karachi car bombing were two car bombings in Karachi, Pakistan on 14 July 1987 that killed 72 people and wounding 250.

Bombings
On 14 July 1987, Two vehicles drove into the Bohri Bazaar in  Karachi, Pakistan packed with RDX and parked. The first car bomb detonated at about 6:30 pm outside a hairdresser's shop on Syedna Burhanuddin Street near a bus stop destroying eight shops and a hotel. The second car bomb detonated 30 minutes later on Raja Ghazanfar Ali Road which is about 100 yards away from the first car bombing. The car bomb detonated outside a record shop, setting multiple buildings on fire and destroying more dozen cars. The fires from the second car bomb continued burning for four hours. The double car bombing killed 72 people and injured 250. The Pakistani government blamed the Afghan intelligence agency for the car bombings. But most of Pakistanis, including Muttahida Qaumi Movement, blamed the ZIa regime for the bombings

Aftermath 
This blast at Bohri Bazaar led Ramzan Chhipa to found Chhipa Welfare Association.

References

1987 murders in Pakistan
1987 car bombing
20th-century mass murder in Pakistan
Car and truck bombings in Pakistan
Improvised explosive device bombings in 1987
1987 car bombing
Mass murder in 1987
1987 car bombing
Massacres in Pakistan
July 1987 crimes
July 1987 events in Asia
Terrorist incidents in Pakistan in 1987